Leonid Petrovich Reshetnikov ((born 6 February 1947, Potsdam) is a Soviet and Russian secret service agent, Lieutenant-General of Foreign Intelligence Service, director of the Russian Institute for Strategic Studies (29 April 2009 – 4 January 2017). Candidate of Historical Sciences.

Biography
Reshetnikov was born in Potsdam (Soviet occupation zone at that time) in the family of a serviceman. In 1970, he graduated from the Faculty of History of Kharkov State University. In 1971-1974 he studied at the graduate school of Sofia University, where he defended thesis for the degree of Candidate of Historical Sciences on the topic "The participation of Bulgarian political emigrants in the construction of socialism in the Soviet Union (1921-1941)". In 1974-1976 he worked at the Institute of Economics of the World Socialist System of the USSR Academy of Sciences.

From April 1976 to April 2009, he served in initially the KGB and later the Foreign Intelligence Service (SVR in Russian). He was the rezident KGB in the Balkans. At the end of his service he held the post of the head of Analysis & Information department of the Russian SVR with the rank of Lieutenant-General. In April 2009, he was dismissed in the reserve for the age limit.

On 29 April 2009 he became a director of the Russian Institute for Strategic Studies. According to presidential decree of 2 November 2016, he was dismissed from 4 January 2017. At this position he is suspected to interference in the United States elections.

He is a member of the Scientific Council under the Minister of Foreign Affairs, the Scientific Council under the Security Council of the Russian Federation and the Public Council under the Ministry of Defense.

He is the president of the Non-profit Charitable Foundation "Heritage" ("Russian Lemnos"). He is also the chairman of the supervisory board of"Tsargrad TV", a "Russian Orthodox" TV channel, owned by Konstantin Malofeev and known for its anti-western geopolitical stance. Member of the editorial board of the magazine "Rodina". In November 2016, he initiated the creation of the “Double-headed Eagle” society and after the formation of this orthodox-monarchist organization in 2018, joined its leadership.

On 10 September 2019 he was banned from entering Bulgaria for a period of ten years, as was Malofeev. According to investigators, Reshetnikov's organizations (RISI and the "Double-headed Eagle") paid for espionage activities in Bulgaria. In particular, a memorandum was found with intentions to change the "geopolitical orientation" of Bulgaria, the creation of a television channel and an own party was supposed.

He is fluent in Russian, Bulgarian and Serbian, and can explain himself in Greek.

Family
He is married to Olga Nikolaevna Reshetnikova, Candidate of Historical Sciences. They have two daughters and four grandchildren. One of his daughters, Elena Reshetnikova, supervises the project "Children's Camp on the Island of Lemnos", organized by the "Heritage"

Notes

Living people
1947 births
National University of Kharkiv alumni
Russian lieutenant generals
Recipients of the Order of Honour (Russia)
Recipients of the Order of Courage
Pro-Russian people of the 2014 pro-Russian unrest in Ukraine
Russians associated with interference in the 2016 United States elections